Reporter is the third album by New Zealand band Goldenhorse, released in 2007 under Siren Records. The album reached no. 38 on the New Zealand charts.

Track listing
"The Last Train"
"Saying My Name"
"Calico Reporter"
"Wisen Up"
"You Want It All"
"Get the Feeling"
"Streetlights"
"Lucky"
"Stone Wall"
"Telephone Call"
"Jump Into the Sun"
"Change of Heart"

Charts

References 

2007 albums
Goldenhorse albums